Schelten Pass (el. 1151 m.) is a high mountain pass in the Jura Mountains between the cantons of Jura and Solothurn in Switzerland.

It connects Mervelier and Ramiswil and is the most direct route from Delémont and Balsthal. The pass road has a maximum grade of 12 percent.

Many bunkers and fortifications built by the Swiss Army during World War II are still visible on the pass.

Hiking paths lead from the pass to Hohe Winde, Passwang, and Delémont.

See also
 List of highest paved roads in Europe
 List of mountain passes
List of the highest Swiss passes

Mountain passes of Switzerland
Mountain passes of the Jura
Mountain passes of the canton of Jura
Mountain passes of the canton of Solothurn
Jura–Solothurn border